Izzat is a 1960 Pakistani film directed by Nazir Ajmeri, who also produced it, and wrote its story and screenplay. It stars Shamim Ara and Ejaz. It was a flop film from Shamim Ara's early career.

Cast 

 Shamim Ara
 Ejaz
 Habib
 Laila
 Saqi
 Chham Chham

Soundtrack 

All music was composed by Nazeer Jaffery, and all lyrics by poet Tufail Hoshiarpuri and Nzaim Panipati.

References

External links 

Pakistani black-and-white films
Urdu-language Pakistani films
1960s Urdu-language films